Centre Street is a major road in Calgary, Alberta, and defines the east and west halves of the city for the purposes of street addresses (i.e. NW, SW, NE, SE).

Route description
The main segment of Centre Street is an arterial road that extends from 9 Avenue S, at the base of the Calgary Tower in Downtown Calgary.  The roadway passes through Chinatown, crosses the Bow River, to the Beddington Boulevard, after which it becomes a residential street and becomes unavailable to private vehicular traffic north of Bergen Crescent (the road continues, but it is only accessible to Calgary Transit and emergency vehicles). The road resumes immediately north of the "bus trap" at Beddington Trail, where it continues as Harvest Hills Boulevard. When the roadway crosses Stoney Trail, the name reverts to Centre Street N and the road continues north and exits the city limits at Highway 566.

In the downtown section, Centre Street is lined by some of Calgary's landmark buildings, such as the Encana Bow building, Suncor Energy Centre (formerly Petro-Canada Centre), the Dragon City Mall, Telus building, Hyatt Regncy hotel and Calgary Tower.

Several non-contiguous sections of Centre Street appear sporadically south of the Calgary Tower, including a segment between 10 Avenue S and 18 Avenue S, also known as Volunteer Way; and a collector road running from 58 Avenue S to Glenmore Trail, where it continues to the south as Fairmount Drive. Macleod Trail forms the division between southwest and southeast quadrants between Glenmore Trail and Highway 22X, while further south the quadrant boundaries are defined by Sheriff King Street.

Future 
The Centre Street N / Harvest Hills Boulevard corridor is chosen alignment for the north leg of the proposed CTrain Green Line, running from downtown Calgary to the North Pointe transit terminal near Country Village Road.  Harvest Hills Boulevard was constructed with a wide right-of-way to accommodate future LRT construction; however, the section along Centre Street N would require either lane removal or property expropriation.  The majority of the rail line would be surface-level, with tunnels at selected major intersections as well as major tunnel across the Bow River and through downtown Calgary. Funding has not been finalized for the project.

Centre Street Bridge

The Centre Street Bridge was built by the City of Calgary in 1916 over the Bow River for $375,000 replacing a steel truss bridge built by a land developer called the Centre Street Bridge Company Limited. It was designed by John F. Green, featured an upper and lower deck, and large cast concrete lions on four massive plinths, two at each end of the bridge.

It went through extensive restoration in 2001, when the bridge was closed for one year. The opening scene of the 2001 Steven Seagal movie Exit Wounds was filmed on the bridge during this closure.

Calgary Transit Bus Routes

The following Calgary Transit bus routes serves Centre Street (as of September 2021, communities served are in parentheses):

Route 2 Killarney/17th Ave./Mount Pleasant (Beddington Heights, Crescent Heights)
Route 3 Heritage Station/Sandstone (Crescent Heights, Tuxedo Park, Highland Park, Thorncliffe, Huntington Hills, Beddington Heights)
Route 4 Huntington (Huntington Hills)
Route 5 North Haven (Huntington Hills)
Route 17 Ramsay/Renfrew (Crescent Heights)
Route 20 Heritage/Northmount (Huntington Hills)
Route 32 Sunridge/Huntington (Huntington Hills, Beddington Heights)
Route 46 Beddington Heights (Beddington Heights, Huntington Hills)
Route 62 Hidden Valley Express (Crescent Heights, Tuxedo Park, Highland Park, Thorncliffe, Huntington Hills)
Route 64 MacEwan Express (Crescent Heights, Tuxedo Park, Highland Park, Thorncliffe, Huntington Hills)
Route 88 Harvest Hills (Beddington Heights, Huntington Hills)
Route 109 Harvest Hills Express (Crescent Heights, Tuxedo Park, Highland Park, Thorncliffe, Huntington Hills, Beddington Heights)
Route 114 Panorama Hills (Huntington Hills, Beddington Heights)
Route 116 Coventry Hills Express (Crescent Heights, Tuxedo Park, Highland Park, Thorncliffe, Huntington Hills, Beddington Heights)
Route 142 Panorama Hills Express (Crescent Heights, Tuxedo Park, Highland Park, Thorncliffe, Huntington Hills, Beddington Heights)
Route 300 BRT Airport/City Centre (Thorncliffe, Highland Park, Tuxedo Park, Crescent Heights)
Route 301 BRT North/City Centre (Crescent Heights, Tuxedo Park, Highland Park, Thorncliffe, Huntington Hills, Beddington Heights)

Major intersections 
From south to north.

See also

Transportation in Calgary

References

Roads in Calgary